Antonín Holý (1 September 1936 – 16 July 2012) was a pioneering Czech scientist. He specialised in the field of chemistry and cooperated on the development of important antiretroviral drugs used  in the treatment of HIV and hepatitis B. He was involved in the creation of the most effective drug (as of early 2009) in the treatment of AIDS. Antonín Holý is the author of more than 450 papers, 400 scientific discoveries and holds 60 patents. With more than 400 discoveries to his credit, his work has affected millions of people with viral diseases such as HIV/AIDS and hepatitis B and many other viral diseases. In 2008 he received an Honorary Professorship at the University of Manchester's School of Chemistry.

Scientific career
Born in Prague, Czechoslovakia, Antonín Holý studied organic chemistry from 1954 to 1959 at the Faculty of Science of Charles University in Prague. From 1960 he trained at the Institute of Organic Chemistry and Biochemistry (IOCB) of the Czechoslovak Academy of Sciences in Prague and had been a researcher there since 1963. He became the Institute's lead scientist in 1967, and from 1983 headed its working group for nucleic acids. In 1987 he became chief of the Department of Nucleic Acid Chemistry and from 1994 to 2002 he was head of the IOCB.

Since 1976 he had collaborated on the development of new antiretroviral drugs with Erik De Clercq of the Rega Institute for Medical Research at the Catholic University of Leuven, Belgium.

His key contribution is the synthesis of nucleotide analogues, synthetic mimetics of the building blocks of RNA and DNA, that have found utility as inhibitors of viral replication. These include Tenofovir, Adefovir and Cidofovir. Although ineffective as originally synthesized by Holy because of impermeability conferred by the negative charged phosphonate, conjugation with POM and POC pro-drug moieties developed by David Farquhar at M.D. Anderson Cancer Center, has made these nucleotide analogues into clinically effective drugs for the treatment of Hepatitis B (biPOM-Adefovir, Hepsera), and biPOC-Tenofovir Tenofovir. Together, these drugs have made an dramatic impact for the treatment of HIV. In particular, Truvada has shown exceptionally useful in preventing HIV transmission and thus has not only helped countless HIV patients, but has in fact prevented countless other healthy individuals from contracting the disease in the first place.       

In 2006 the US biopharmaceutical company Gilead Sciences, under the direction of Tomáš Cihlář, and the Institute of Organic Chemistry and Biochemistry (IOCB) of the Academy of Sciences of the Czech Republic jointly established a new research center, oriented to the development of new preparations. Gilead promised the IOCB a $1.1 million donation, to fund its operations and research for 5 years.

Several antiretroviral drugs based on Holý's discoveries have been licensed. In 1996, Vistide was approved for production in the United States and European Union. Viread (tenofovir) was approved in the US in 2001 for the treatment of AIDS, and Hepsera was approved in 2003 for the treatment of hepatitis B. Truvada, a combination of Viread and emtricitabine, was approved in 2006 for use in the USA.

Death
Holý had retired a year before his death and died of an unspecified cause, aged 75, on 16 July 2012. A statement from the IOCB called his death "an immense loss". His death occurred two months after the U.S. Food and Drug Administration (FDA) approved Truvada for treating HIV.

Awards and honours
 1984 State Prize for Chemistry (Acyklická analoga nukleosidů a nukleotidů)
 1998 Honor plaque: Nucleic Acids Chemistry journal
 1999 Hanuš's Medal of the Czech Chemical Society; Honorary doctorate of the Palacký University in Olomouc
 2001 Descartes Prize of the European Union; The Medal of Merit of the Czech Republic (Za zásluhy) I. degree
 2002 Elion Award of International Society for Antiviral Research; State Medal "Pour merit"
 2003 Honorary membership in the Rega Institute for Medical Research, Catholic University of Leuven, Belgium.
 2004 Award Praemium Bohemiae; Medal of the Czech Academy of Sciences: De scientia et humanitate optime meritis
 2005 Honorary doctorate of the Ghent University (Belgium); The Medal of Merit of the Faculty of Science at the Charles University in Prague.
 2006 Member of the  European Academy of Sciences and Arts (Salzburg)
 2006 Honorary doctorate of the Institute of Chemical Technology in Prague
 2007 State Prize "Czech Head" (Česká hlava)
 2008 Honorary Professorship at the School of Chemistry, University of Manchester
 2009 Honorary doctorate of the University of South Bohemia in České Budějovice
 2011 Silver memorial medal of the Senate of the Parliament of the Czech Republic
 2012 Silver medal of the City of Prague

See also
 Adefovir
 Cidofovir
 Tenofovir

References

External links

1936 births
2012 deaths
Czech chemists
Gilead Sciences people
Scientists from Prague
Recipients of Medal of Merit (Czech Republic)
Members of the European Academy of Sciences and Arts
Charles University alumni
Institute of Organic Chemistry and Biochemistry of the CAS